Haikou City Stadium is located at the southeastern corner of Evergreen Park, Haikou, Hainan, China.

References

External links

Buildings and structures in Haikou
Sports venues completed in 1994
Sports venues in Hainan